is a Japanese voice actress from Takatsuki, Osaka who is affiliated with I'm Enterprise. She is the twin sister of voice actress Satsumi Matsuda. She is known for her roles as Hakumei in Hakumei and Mikochi and Noella in Drugstore in Another World.

Biography
Matsuda was born in Takatsuki, Osaka on July 16, 1993, one day before her twin sister Satsumi. In 2010 and 2011, she and Satsumi participated in the Animax Anison Grand Prix, after which both enrolled at the Japan Narration Actor Institute.

Matsuda made her voice acting debut in 2014, playing background roles in The Irregular at Magic High School and Sword Art Online. In 2015, she played the role of Azuna Kuzuha in Dance with Devils. In 2016, she played the role of Minael in Magical Girl Raising Project. In 2018, she played the roles of Kaoru Mashiko in Katana Maidens: Toji No Miko and Hakumei in Hakumei and Mikochi. In 2017, she played Luca Esposito in Astra Lost in Space. In 2020, she played Lucifer in Lapis Re:Lights. In 2021, she played Chika Sawada in Kageki Shojo!! and Noella in Drugstore in Another World.

Filmography

Television animation
2014
The Irregular at Magic High School
Sword Art Online II

2015
Uta no Prince-sama as Female fan, spectator
Mysterious Joker as Bela
Aikatsu! as Ken-chan
Ultimate Otaku Teacher as Taki Komiya
Shomin Sample as Maya Mibu
Dance with Devils as Azuna Kuzuha

2016
Magical Girl Raising Project as Minael
Love Live! Sunshine!! as Yoshimi
The Asterisk War as Li Shenhua
New Game! as Ren
Keijo!!!!!!!! as Ai Shimada (episode 4)

2017
New Game!! as Ren

2018
Katana Maidens: Toji No Miko as Kaoru Mashiko
Hakumei and Mikochi as Hakumei
Laid-Back Camp as Akari Inuyama
Anima Yell! as Suzuko Nekoya

2019
Katana Maidens: Mini Toji as Kaoru Mashiko
Kemono Friends 2 as Leopard
Kaiju Girls as Miko Innnami
Astra Lost in Space as Luca Esposito

2020
Lapis Re:Lights as Lucifer
The Case Files of Jeweler Richard as Young Seigi
Yu-Gi-Oh! Sevens as Hunt Goto

2021
Kageki Shojo!! as Chika Sawada
Drugstore in Another World as Noella

2022
Miss Kuroitsu from the Monster Development Department, Hydra's first and third sisters
Smile of the Arsnotoria the Animation, Spirit
Arknights: Prelude To Dawn, Skullshatterer (Alex)

Film animation
2021
Jujutsu Kaisen 0 as Mimiko Hasaba
2022
Laid-Back Camp Movie as Akari Inuyama

Original net animation
2021
The Missing 8 as Emory
Jewelpet Attack Travel! as O-Saru

References

External links
Official agency profile 

1993 births
Living people
I'm Enterprise voice actors
Japanese video game actresses
Japanese voice actresses
Twin actresses
Voice actresses from Osaka Prefecture
People from Takatsuki, Osaka